is a town located in Aomori Prefecture, Japan.

Geography
Takko occupies the far southeast corner of Aomori Prefecture, south of the Hakkōda Mountains. Much of the town is mountainous with peaks ranging from 700 to 1000 meters.  The mountainous area is home to many indigenous plant and animal species. Wildlife includes Japanese macaque monkeys, kamoshika, tanuki, and Asian black bears. The residential area is mainly along the river basins such as the Kumabara River, the Ayome River, and the Okawa River, which flow from east to west through the town.

Neighbouring municipalities 
Aomori Prefecture
Sannohe District
Sannohe
Iwate Prefecture
Ninohe
Hachimantai
Akita Prefecture
Kazuno

Climate
The town has a cold Humid continental climate characterized by cool, short summers and long, cold winters with extremely heavy snowfall (Köppen climate classification Dfa). The average annual temperature in Takko is 8.8 °C. The average annual rainfall is 1375 mm with September as the wettest month. The temperatures are highest on average in August, at around 22.4 °C, and lowest in January, at around -3.8 °C.

Demographics
Per Japanese census data, the population of Takko peaked at around the year 1960 and has declined steadily over the past 60 years. It is now less than it was a century ago.

History
The area around Takko has been inhabited since prehistoric times, and numerous Jōmon period remains have been discovered. The town name is derived from an Ainu word “tapkop”, meaning “small hill”. During the Edo period, the area was controlled by the Nambu clan of Morioka Domain and later by Hachinohe Domain. During the post-Meiji restoration establishment of the modern municipalities system on 1 April 1889, Takko Village was created as a separate village from former Kamigō Village. It was elevated to town status on November 10, 1928. On March 1, 1955, Kamigō Village merged back with Takko Town.

Government
Takko has a mayor-council form of government with a directly elected mayor and a unicameral town council of ten members. Takko is part of Sannohe District which contributes three members to the Aomori Prefectural Assembly. In terms of national politics, the town is part of Aomori 2nd district of the lower house of the Diet of Japan.

Economy
The economy of Takko is heavily dependent on agriculture and forestry. The main crop is garlic, of which Takko is Japan's largest producer.

Education
Takko has three public elementary schools and one public middle school operated by the town government and one public high school operated by the Aomori Prefectural Board of Education.

High school (1)
 Takko Senior High School (Prefectural)
Middle school (1)
 Takko Junior High School
Elementary schools (3)
 Takko Elementary School
 Shimizugashira Elementary School
 Kamigō Elementary School
Kindergarten (1)
 Takko Kindergarten
Nursery schools (2)
 Takko Hoikuen
 Kamigo Hoikuen

Transportation

Railway
The town has no passenger railway service. The nearest train station is Sannohe Station on the Aoimori Railway Aoimori Railway Line.

Highway

International relations
 – Gilroy, California, United States, sister city since April 18, 1988
 – Monticelli d'Ongina, Emilia-Romagna, Italy – sister city since September 11, 1992
 - Seosan, South Chungcheong Province, Korea, friendship city since June 22, 2012

Noted people from Takko
Sampachi Kawa – manga artist

References

External links

 Official Website 

Towns in Aomori Prefecture
Takko, Aomori